The following is List of Universities and Colleges in Ningxia.

References
List of Chinese Higher Education Institutions — Ministry of Education
List of Chinese universities, including official links
Ningxia Institutions Admitting International Students  (China Scholarship Council December 4, 2008)

 
Ningxia